Goran Simić (Belgrade, 1953 – Vienna, 2008) was a Serbian bass. He was a member of the Sarajevo Opera (1978-1984) and the Vienna State Opera (1984–2008), where he sang 55 different roles in 1,095 performances. He was in "Un ballo in maschera" with Plácido Domingo in the role of Samuel. He died the 28 November 2008 in Vienna following a long illness.

References
  Diverdi, November 2008 (Obituary)
 https://www.youtube.com/watch?v=RxCiYXe6WkI
https://www.youtube.com/watch?v=m8T8pZ8x_8g

1953 births
2008 deaths
20th-century Serbian male opera singers
Singers from Belgrade
Yugoslav male opera singers